Institution of Engineers may refer to
 Institution of Engineers, Bangladesh
Hong Kong Institution of Engineers
 Institution of Engineering and Technology, Britain
 Institution of Engineers, Bangladesh
 Institution of Engineers (India)
 Institution of Engineers of Ireland
 Institution of Engineers and Shipbuilders in Scotland
 Institution of Engineers, Sri Lanka
 Zimbabwe Institution of Engineers